Palermo is a  village in Antioquia, Colombia.

Populated places in the Antioquia Department